Paul "Smokey" Smith (born 23 January 1980) is a British professional drift driver from Spalding, Lincolnshire. He drives a 1JZ powered Nissan Silvia S15 for Team Japspeed. He won the British Drift Championship in 2012 after several years of competition.

Career
Smith began drifting in 2004 in a Nissan 200SX at a Silverstone Circuit practice day. During the following year, he began competing in the UKD1 Autoglym Clubman Championship in a newly built Nissan Skyline R32, finishing the season in second place, missing out on the title by a single point.

He continued competing in the Pro-Am Eurodrift Championship until he obtained a European Drift Championship license at the final round of the 2007 season, qualifying 5th overall. He competed in EDC in 2008, achieving Top 8 finishes.

Smith competed in the British Drift Championship from 2009, achieving several podium finishes, until 2012, a season in which he showed vast improvement as a driver and won the championship at Knockhill Racing Circuit.

References

External links
Paul Smith's driver profile

Drifting drivers
D1 Grand Prix drivers
English racing drivers
Living people
1980 births